is a Japanese paper milling company. It was established in 1907.

References

External links
 Hokuetsu official site 

Pulp and paper companies of Japan
Manufacturing companies based in Tokyo
Companies listed on the Tokyo Stock Exchange
Japanese companies established in 1907
Japanese brands